Agus Harimurti Yudhoyono (born 10 August 1978), more commonly referred to as AHY, is an Indonesian politician and former army major who is currently serving as the leader of the Democratic Party. Serving in the army from 2000 until 2016, he is the Executive Director of the Yudhoyono Institute and founder of the Agus Harimurti Yudhoyono Foundation. He is the son of former Indonesian president Susilo Bambang Yudhoyono, more commonly known as SBY.

Born on 10 August 1978, in Bandung, West Java, Agus graduated from the Indonesian Military Academy in 1999. During his time in the military, he undertook higher formal education. He received a Master of Science in Strategic Studies at Nanyang Technological University, Singapore in 2006, Master in Public Administration from Harvard University, United States in 2010, and Master of Arts in Leadership and Management from Webster University in the United States. While serving in the Indonesian Army, AHY joined the security operations in Aceh in 2002 and UN peace operations in Lebanon in 2006. He also co-founded the Indonesian Defense University. In 2015, he led one of the Capital's security units. In 2016, he left the military and entered politics.

In 2016, he was appointed by the Democratic Party, the National Awakening Party (PKB), the United Development Party (PPP), and the National Mandate Party (PAN), to become a candidate for the 2017 Jakarta Governor election. Despite losing the election to Anies Baswedan, he remained active in politics. He commanded the Joint Task Command (Kogasma) to win Indonesia's 2019 General Election. On early 2019 he targeted to achieve 15 percent of national vote, but later he revised the target to achieve 10 percent of national vote. He was then given a new position as Deputy chairman of the Democratic Party. He was also elected to be the leader of the Democratic Party by acclamation on 15 March 2020.

Early life, family, and education

Early life and family 
Agus Harimurti Yudhoyono was born on 10 August 1978, in Bandung, West Java. His father is Susilo Bambang Yudhoyono, the 6th President of the Republic of Indonesia and former General of the Armed Forces. While his mother is Kristiani Herrawati, more commonly known as Ani Yudhoyono. He is also the grandson of Lt. Gen. (ret.) Sarwo Edhie Wibowo (1925–1989), who was the father of his mother. He also has one younger brother, Edhie Baskoro Yudhoyono, born in 1980.

During his childhood, he moved and lived in numbers of places, following his father's duties and education as an army officer. He spent most of his childhood in East Timor when his father took up military service there.

Education

Early education 
From 1984 to 1988, he studied at the Kuntum Wijaya Kusuma Elementary School, in Pasar Rebo, East Jakarta. From 1988 to 1991, he followed his father to continue his education in the United States, attending David J. Brewer School, Leavenworth, Kansas. In 1991, AHY continued his study at SMPN 5 Bandung. Following the transfer of his father's assignment, in 1994, AHY moved to SMPN 20 East Jakarta. After completing his Junior High School education, AHY continued his education at Taruna Nusantara High School, Magelang in 1994. During his high school time, AHY was an active and outstanding student, he had served as Chairman of the Taruna Nusantara High School Student Council. In 1997, AHY won the Garuda Trisakti Tarunatama Emas, an award for the best graduate.

Higher education 
He is a Military Academy graduate. During his first and second years at the Military Academy, he won the Tri Sakti Wiratama award given for collective achievements in academic, physical and personal personality. This achievement led AHY to be chosen as Commander of the Youth Corps Regiment in 1999. There, he also joined the Drum band Canka Lokananta Military Academy as a bass drummer, (who is often referred to as "Tidar Tiger"). AHY then passed AKMIL with the best graduate and awarded Bintang Adi Makayasa in December 2000. During his assignment in the military as an officer, AHY also undertook formal higher education. AHY has three Masters education degrees: Master of Science in Strategic Studies at Nanyang Technological University, Singapore in 2006, Master in Public Administration from Harvard University, United States in 2010, and Master of Arts in Leadership and Management from Webster University in the United States, won the title of summa cum laude in 2015 with the GPA of 4.0.

Military service 

Yudhoyono served the Indonesian National Army, following the footsteps of his grandfather Sarwo Edhie Wibowo and his father SBY, he carried out a variety of assignments and missions, starting from the platoon commander in the Operations section to the company commander in the elite unit of the 305 Kostrad Airborne Infantry Battalion.

After graduating from AKMIL, AHY attended the Infantry Branching School and the Intel Combat Course in 2001. He later joined the Army Strategic Reserves Command (Kostrad). In 2002, AHY who was a Brigadier of 17 Kostrad, assigned as a platoon commander in the 305th Airborne Infantry Battalion / Tengkorak. That time, he was sent  to Aceh for a risky task in the Security Restoration Operation. In Aceh, AHY was chosen as the Commander of the Special Team.

After leading the special forces in Operation Security Restoration in Aceh, in November 2006, AHY assumed the task of serving as a Garuda XXIII-A contingent operations section officer in maintaining peace along the Israeli and Southern Lebanese borders, when Israel and Hezbollah were involved in 2006 Lebanon War. This contingent is the first Indonesian contingent sent for a UN peace mission in Lebanon (UNIFIL). During his assignment, AHY initiated the smart car program as a means of reducing the impact of the trauma of war on children. For this initiative, AHY was awarded the Army Service Distinction Medal from the leadership of the Lebanese Armed Forces. 

Later that year, AHY was asked for his contribution by Minister of Defense, Prof. Dr. Juwono Sudarsono, to join the initiation of the Indonesian Defense University. AHY then continued his military education at the US Army Maneuver Captain Career Course at Fort Benning, United States in 2011 and became the best graduate. He also won the Order of Saint Maurice medal from the National Infantry Association.

Returning to Indonesia, he served as the Head of Operations Section (Kasiops) at the 17 Kujang 1 Kostang Cross-air Infantry Brigade. In 2013, he was assigned as a Post-Graduate Lecturer, in the Defense Management program, the Indonesian Defense University. In 2015, AHY returned to US to join another military academy, and later won the title summa cum laude from the US Army Command and General Staff College at Fort Leavenworth, Kansas. Until early 2016, AHY was assigned as the commander of 203 Arya Kamuning Mechanical Infantry Battalion, one of the elite security forces of the Jakarta.

Career 

On 10 August 2017, AHY founded The Yudhoyono Institute, a think tank based on three pillars: Liberty, Prosperity, Security. As Executive Director, AHY initiated various programs to welcome and prepare the Indonesian golden generation, the target of which was achieved in 100 years of Indonesian Independence, in 2045. Through TYI, AHY often holds various activities such as: Roundtable Discussion to discuss various challenges and issues facing the Indonesian people and the world with experts and statesmen; People's Dialogue is carried out to absorb the aspirations of people in various regions from various circles; and public lectures on campuses and educational institutions throughout the archipelago, from Banda Aceh to Jayapura. He continuously shares inspiration, knowledge and experience with academics, students and youths.

Together with The Yudhoyono Institute, AHY also formed the AHY Foundation, which focuses on social and humanitarian issues, especially health, education and the environment as well as disaster response. AHY Foundation is active in providing assistance to disaster victims such as in Palu, Lombok, Gunung Agung Bali, Pacitan floods and Gunung Kidul, Yogyakarta. In addition, through the AHY Foundation, he also initiated blood donor programs, tree and coral reef planting programs in various regions in Indonesia.

Political career

2017 Jakarta gubernatorial election 
AHY began his political career as a candidate for DKI Jakarta governor in the 2017 Jakarta gubernatorial election. With the support of a coalition formed by 4 political parties: the Democratic Party, the National Awakening Party (PKB), the United Development Party (PPP), and the National Mandate Party (PAN). In his very first election, he was paired with an experienced local bureaucrat, Syliviana Murni.

The Agus-Sylvi challenged the incumbent Basuki Tjahja Purnama-Djarot Saiful Hidayat (Ahok-Djarot) and Anies Baswedan-Sandiaga Uno (Anies-Sandi). Agus-Sylvi gets sequence number 1, Ahok-Djarot gets sequence number 2, and Anies-Sandi gets sequence number 3. AHY was defeated on the election, garnering only 17.02% of the votes.

2019 General Election 
On 17 February 2018, Democratic Party Chairperson Susilo Bambang Yudhoyono (SBY) confirmed AHY as Commander of the Joint Task Force (Kogasma) for the 2018 Head of Region Election (Pemilukada) and 2019 General Election.

He became a Democratic Party campaigner and he consolidated cadres in the region to win candidates nominated by the Democratic Party in the 2018 General Election. The Democratic Party succeeded in achieving the initial target of 35 percent from 171 elections.

In the 2019 elections, the Presidential Elections (Pilpres) and Legislative Elections (Pileg) were held simultaneously. At the 2019 Presidential Election, the Democratic Party formed a coalition with the political party supporting Prabowo-Sandi. In the 2019 Legislative election, the Democratic Party targeted 15 percent of the total number of seats in the Indonesian Parliament.

AHY as Commander of Kogasma led the efforts to bring victory for the Democratic Party. In the 2019 legislative election, the Democratic Party in various surveys is predicted to only be able to win less than 5 percent of the vote. Under his leadership the Democratic Party was able to win 10,876,507 votes (7.77 percent), exceeding the predictions of various surveys, though it failed to achieve the party target of 10 percent.

Post-2019 General Election 
For his achievements, in October 2019 AHY was appointed as Deputy Chairman of the Democratic Party. AHY is expected to be able to bring the Democratic Party towards better and progressive change. AHY was elected as the leader of the Democratic Party on 15 March 2020, replacing his father.

Personal life 

On 8 July 2005, AHY married Annisa Larasati Pohan, former radio announcer who had been the cover girl (Gadis Sampul) of 1997. Annisa Pohan is the daughter of former Indonesian Bank (BI) Deputy governor, Aulia Pohan. When married, AHY was an officer with the rank of First lieutenant, at that time he was 27 years old, and Annisa was 24 years old. Annisa is also a Co-founder of Tunggadewi Foundation.

At their wedding, they used Javanese customs which were laden with military nuance by carrying out the Pora Sword tradition. Their wedding reception was held at Bogor Presidential Palace and attended by 2,000 invited guests. Their first daughter, Almira Tunggadewi Yudhoyono, was born on 17 August 2008.

Honors and awards

Honors

National honors 
 Indonesia: Satya Lencana Wira Karya (2014)
 Indonesia: Pioneering Medal of the Republic of Indonesia (2011)

Foreign honors 
: Recipient of the Order of Saint Maurice (2011)
: Army Service Distinction Medal, Commander of the Lebanese Armed Forces (2007)
: UN Peacekeeping Distinction Medal, Commander of the UNIFIL (2007)

Honorary appointments 
: Honorary member of the 707th Special Mission Battalion, Republic of Korea Army Special Warfare Command (2013)

Awards 
RMOL Democracy Award, Rakyat Merdeka Online (2017)
JCI Ten Outstanding Young Persons (TOYP), Junior Chamber International (2017)
Bintang Adi Makayasa (2000)
Sword of Trisakti Wiratama, Military Academy (2000)
Bintang Garuda Trisakti Tarunatama Emas, Taruna Nusantara High School (1997)
Nanyang Outstanding Young Alumni Award, Nanyang Technological University (2012)

Job history 

 First Officer of the Infantry Armament Center (2000)
 First Officer of the Army's Strategic Branch Command (2001)
 First Officer Infantry Division 1 / Kostrad (2002)
 Platoon III / C Commander of the 305th Airborne Infantry Battalion / Tengkorak (2002)
 Platoon II / C Commander of 305th Airborne Infantry Battalion / Tengkorak (2003)
 Head of Section 2 / Operations of the 305th Airborne Infantry Battalion / Skull (2004)
 Company Commander Rifle C Airborne 305 Infantry Battalion C / Company Skull (2005)
 Head of Operations Section of the Garuda XXIII-A Mechanical Contingent Infantry Battalion (2006)
 First Officer of Indonesian National Army Headquarters (2008)
 Assistant Section Chief of the American Section of the Ministry of Defense of the Republic of Indonesia (2008)
 First Officer of the Directorate General of Strategic and Defense Ministry of Defense of the Republic of Indonesia (2009)
 Intermediate Officer Indonesian National Army Headquarters / Student Advanced Course Officer (United States) (2010)
 Head of Section 2 / Operation of the 17th Airborne Infantry Brigade / Kujang I Kostrad (2011)
 Middle Officer Indonesian National Army Headquarters (2013)
 Head of Domestic Cooperation Sub Division of Indonesian Defense University (2014)mdjdcdd
 Detachment Middle Officer Army Headquarters (School Education Staff and Command LN) (2014)
 Commander of the 203rd Mechanical Infantry Battalion / Arya Kemuning (2015)
 The Yudhoyono Institute's Executive Director (2017)
 Commander of the Democratic Party Kogasma (2018)
 Deputy Chair of the Democratic Party (2019)

Publications 

 2019 Simultaneous Elections 2019 and the Challenges of Our Democracy, Strategy Magazine V edition.
 2019 Celebrating Democracy Without Polarization, Jawa Pos Daily.
 2018 Energi Muda Nusantara, Strategy Magazine edition IV.
 2018 Sacrifice and Nationality, Republika Daily
 2018 Restores the Youth Oath Spirit, Republika Daily.
 2017 Planting Hope from Grassroots, Strategy Magazine III edition.
 2017 Realizing Indonesia Gold 2045, Strategy Magazine edition I.
 2017 Reflections on Pancasila in the 21st Century, Harian Rakyat Merdeka National Daily.
 2017 Islam Knitting Brotherhood, Republika National Daily.
 2017 Test for Democracy and Our Nationality, Kompas National Daily.
 2017 Jakarta for All, Sindo National Daily.
 2017 Jakarta for the People, Expose, Mizan. 2016 TNI and 21st Century Defense Diplomacy, Patriot Magazine.
 2015 In the Hands of the Young Generation, Indonesia Succeeds in 2045, Indonesia Future Society (IFS) Newsletter Vol. 01
 2015 Optimizing the Role of Dansat in Enhancing the Professionalism of Soldiers, as well as Developing Effective Combat Doctrines in Order to Win Future Battles, Yudhagama Journal.
 2014 4000 Peacekeepers: Choice or Inevitability ?, Jawa Pos Newspaper.
 2013 'Freedom or Death' Is Not Enough : Common Interests vs Joint Enemies, National Journal Newspaper.
 2013 Young Generation Welcomes Indonesia 2045, Koran Media Indonesia.
 2013 The Future of Warfare: Challenges Show TNI Needs Adaptive Leaders, The Jakarta Globe.
 2013 Future Challenges of the TNI, Kompas Newspaper.
 2013 Indonesia & Korea: 40 Years of Friendship & Beyond, Young Future Leaders Forum – Seoul, South Korea.
 2013 2045: Path to Nation's Golden Age, The Jakarta Globe. 2013 Responding to the Challenges of the 21st Century, Apple Commander of the Armed Forces Army.
 2012 Preparing the Doctrine of Fighting in the Era of "Warm Peace", Jurnal Yudhagama, Vol. 32 No.4.
 2012 Realizing New Security Challenges and Sharing Responsibility, The Jakarta Post.
 2012 Looking at the Future of the TNI, Kompas Newspaper.
 2011 The Indonesian Defense University: Transforming the Indonesian Military and Creating a Better Public Awareness on the Significance of the National Security and Defense Sectors, ASEAN Regional Forum – Heads of Defense / Universities / Colleges / Institutions Meeting / ARF-HDUCIM.
 2010 Unlikely Routes: Stronger Militaries by Transforming Military Education, Harvard Law School National Security Journal.
 2008 Winning The Hearts and Minds: Lessons Learned From The Indonesian Peacekeeping Mission in Lebanon, Ministry of Foreign Affairs.

References 

1978 births
Living people
People from Bandung
Children of national leaders
Agus
Harvard Kennedy School alumni
Webster University alumni
Non-U.S. alumni of the Command and General Staff College
Democratic Party (Indonesia) politicians
21st-century Indonesian politicians